The Alberni Valley Times was a Canadian daily newspaper published weekdays in Port Alberni, on Vancouver Island in British Columbia until it was closed in 2015 by the Black Press. The paper is owned by Black Press, which also published the Nanaimo Daily News and several weekly newspapers on the island.

History
The Times was part of David Radler's Sterling Newspapers chain in the 1970s, and became part of the Southam chain when Radler and Conrad Black incorporated Southam into Hollinger Inc.; this chain was, at the time, the dominant newspaper publisher in British Columbia, and also included the Nanaimo Daily News, Times Colonist and several weeklies.

Along with the rest of Southam, ownership of the Vancouver Island newspapers passed to Canwest in 2000, then Postmedia Network in 2010.

Postmedia sold its Vancouver Island properties and Lower Mainland weeklies to Glacier Media in 2011 for $86.5 million. In 2015, Glacier Media sold all its island papers except for the Times Colonist to Black Press.

See also
List of newspapers in Canada

References

External links
Alberni Valley Times – Official website

Port Alberni
Newspapers established in 1967
Daily newspapers published in British Columbia
1967 establishments in British Columbia